PandaVision (Dutch: PandaDroom, translation: PandaDream) was a 4-D film shown in the Dutch theme park Efteling, sponsored by the World Wide Fund for Nature (WWF). It was inaugurated on 19 June 2002 by Prince Bernhard. The attraction closed in 2019.

Pre-show
In a large waiting hall, a 15-minute movie about the WWF was projected on screens.

Main show
With the 3D spectacles provided, a maximum of 400 visitors entered the main theater. During the next 12 minutes, the movie Dream of the Panda took the visitor to the North Pole, ocean and jungle which are, according to the movie, all in the gravest of dangers and only the power of the WWF can save them now.

The movie was made by Movetrix NWave Pictures and had special simulation effects like moving seats, splashing water, blowing wind and a 1000 kg tree branch (made by the Stakebrand company) that falls into the audience.

After the movie

After movie the guests could have a look at some more WWF material, and children could play in a WWF playground while their parents signed up for the WWF.

References

Efteling
3D short films
World Wide Fund for Nature
4D films
Animatronic attractions